Cloniatarphes is a monotypic moth genus of the family Erebidae. Its only species, Cloniatarphes carunalis, is found in Brazil. Both the genus and the species were first described by Schaus in 1916.

References

Herminiinae
Monotypic moth genera